Authorea is an online collaborative writing tool that allows researchers to write, cite, collaborate, host data and publish. It has been described as "Google Docs for Scientists".
It has been owned by the commercial publishing company Wiley through Atypon since 2018.

Overview 

Authorea allows researchers to write documents together and attach references, figures, data, and source code. Features of the tool include collaborative editing (multiple people editing a document at the same time), automatic citation formatting, tracking changes, and the ability to make any document public or fully private.

When used as an editing tool for scientific papers, Authorea will automatically format a paper in the preferred style and provide files suitable for online submission to peer-reviewed journals and conferences. Over 40 publisher- and journal-specific styles are currently supported.

Authorea is part of the open science movement and supports open access publishing for academic research and free access to research data. The free version of the service allows unlimited public documents, public storage space (for figures, data, code, and other supporting material), and an unlimited number of collaborators (co-authors) per document. Public documents are free for anyone to read.

Authorea also supports private writing: a document and all its attachments can be kept private, visible only to co-authors. A free account allows the user to create one free private document, with more available via a paid subscription.

Authorea also supports preprint workflows. Authorea partnered with bioRxiv to enable authors to submit preprints directly to bioRxiv from Authorea in 2017. Additionally, preprint review hosting platform PREreview was built using Authorea technical infrastructure.

The site currently supports an online LaTeX editor as well as a Markdown (wiki) editor. A simple MS Word-like (WYSIWYG) interface is currently in development.

Authorea grew from over 10,000 active users in 2014 to over 50,000 in 2016.

History 

Authorea was launched in February 2013 by co-founders Alberto Pepe and Nathan Jenkins and scientific adviser Matteo Cantiello, who met while working at CERN. They recognized common difficulties in the scholarly writing and publishing process. To address these problems, Pepe and Jenkins developed an online, web-based editor to support real-time collaborative writing, and sharing and execution of research data and code. Jenkins finished the first prototype site build in less than three weeks.

Bootstrapping for almost two years, Pepe and Jenkins grew Authorea by reaching out to friends and colleagues, speaking at events and conferences, and partnering with early adopter institutions.

In September 2014, Authorea announced the successful closure of a $610K round of seed funding with the New York Angels and ff Venture Capital groups.
In January 2016, Authorea closed a $1.6M round of funding led by Lux Capital and including the Knight Foundation and Bloomberg Beta. It later acquired the VC-backed company The Winnower.

In 2018 Authorea was acquired for an undisclosed amount by Atypon (part of Wiley).

List of features 

The Authorea platform supports a number of features relevant to academic writing.

Collaboration 

 Collaborative writing – Multiple users can edit a document at the same time
 Commenting – Document sections and highlighted text can be annotated with public or private comments
 Live chat in-article – Co-authors can chat online while writing
 Change tracking – The full history of the document is tracked with Git; individual edits can be reviewed and undone

Formatting and citations 

 Citation Search – The built-in citation search allows adding full citations directly from PubMed and CrossRef, or from a paper's DOI
 Reference Formatting – Authorea automatically formats references for a target publication upon export
 Publisher styles – Over 40 publisher and journal style templates are supported
 Equations – Authorea supports equations written in LaTeX markup

Rich content 

 Figures – Drag-and-drop figures directly into a document or upload figures from a folder
 Data publishing – Raw data files and iPython notebooks can be attached to figures
 Live source code – Authorea provides a live iPython Notebook server for opening and running attached iPython notebooks. Allows calculations and data analysis
 Interactive figures – Authorea supports interactive figures using D3.js

Export and import 

 GitHub and Offline Editing – Documents and files are stored in Git repositories on Authorea servers. Each document can be synced to a GitHub account for offline editing and backup
 Export – Word, PDF, and LaTeX export formats are supported
 Import – Users can import a LaTeX or .docx file to create a new Authorea document

Technical architecture 

Authorea is built primarily with Ruby on Rails, and documents and files are stored in Git repositories. Resque and Faye are used as well.

The site supports iPython notebooks and runs a live iPython notebook server, so that users can attach, re-run and reproduce scientific calculations and data analysis directly in an Authorea document.

References

External links

Online word processors
Web applications
Open access projects